Jack Mortimer (17 March 1913 – 11 March 2007) was a British wrestler. He competed in the men's Greco-Roman featherweight at the 1948 Summer Olympics.

References

External links
 

1913 births
2007 deaths
British male sport wrestlers
Olympic wrestlers of Great Britain
Wrestlers at the 1948 Summer Olympics
Place of birth missing